Paul Stephenson (born 22 September 1983) is an Australian former professional rugby league footballer who played in the 2000s for the Cronulla-Sutherland Sharks and Manly Warringah Sea Eagles in the NRL.

Background
Stephenson was born in Newcastle, New South Wales, Australia.

Playing career
Stephenson played at centre and made his professional rugby debut with the Manly Warringah Sea Eagles before signing with Cronulla for the 2007 season . Stephenson played well as an interchange forward for the Sharks, winning the club Premier League Coaches Award .  Stephenson had represented NSW residents and Qld country.

Post playing
After his professional career finished, Stephenson moved to Brisbane with his family and played 2 seasons with the Ipswich Jets under the guidance of Glen Lazarus and later with the Tweed Heads Seagulls. Paul is Currently CEO of the Tweed Heads Seagulls RLFC

References

External links
Cronulla Sharks Profile
NRL profile

1983 births
Living people
Australian rugby league players
Cronulla-Sutherland Sharks players
Manly Warringah Sea Eagles players
Rugby league centres
Rugby league players from Newcastle, New South Wales
Rugby league wingers